Richard Douglas Thomson (16 August 1940 – 3 May 2012) was a New Zealand cyclist. He competed in the individual road race and the team time trial events at the 1968 Summer Olympics.

References

External links
 

1940 births
2012 deaths
New Zealand male cyclists
Olympic cyclists of New Zealand
Cyclists at the 1968 Summer Olympics
Sportspeople from Oamaru
Cyclists at the 1962 British Empire and Commonwealth Games
Cyclists at the 1966 British Empire and Commonwealth Games
Commonwealth Games competitors for New Zealand